Hendrik Hart (December 14, 1935 – March 15, 2021), often known as Henk Hart, was a Dutch-Canadian philosopher based in Toronto.

History 
Hendrik Hart taught systematic philosophy at the Institute for Christian Studies, Toronto, since its founding in 1967 until his retirement in 2001. Prior to that he was head of the philosophical Institute of the Free University in Amsterdam, where he studied under D. H. Th. Vollenhoven.  His doctoral dissertation was written on the topic of John Dewey's theory of verification and was supervised by Dutch philosopher S. U. Zuidema.

Hendrik Hart was an emeritus professor at the Institute for Christian Studies. He died on March 15, 2021.

Bibliography 

Hart, Hendrik; K. A. Bril; and Jacob Klapwijk (editors) The Idea of a Christian philosophy: Essays in Honour of D H Th Vollenhoven (Toronto: Wedge, 1973)
Hart, Hendrik. Setting our sights by the Morning Star (1989)
Hart, Hendrik.  Understanding Our World (Lanham, Maryland, USA: University Press of America, 1984; 2002).
Hart, Hendrik; Johan Van Der Hoeven; and Nicolas Wolterstorff (editors) Rationality in the Calvinian Tradition (University Press of America, 1984)
Hart, Hendrik; and Kai Nielsen. The Search for Community in a Withering Tradition (1991)
Hart, Hendrik. "Foreword" (pages vii-xxi) in Against Nature? Types of Moral Argumentation regarding Homosexuality Pim Pronk (Translated from the Dutch by John Vriend), Wm. B. Eerdmans Publishing Company, 1993, 
Hart, Hendrik; and others (editors) Walking the Tightrope of Faith (Rodopi,1999)
Hart, Hendrik; and others (editor) An Ethos of Compassion and the Integrity of Creation (University Press of America, 1995)
Hart, Hendrik; and William Sweet. Responses to the Enlightenment: An Exchange on Foundations, Faith, and Community (Brill, 2012).

References

External links 
Faculty page

1935 births
2021 deaths
People from Toronto
Canadian philosophers
Academics in Ontario
Calvin University alumni
Calvinist and Reformed philosophers
Dutch emigrants to Canada
Vrije Universiteit Amsterdam alumni
Academic staff of Vrije Universiteit Amsterdam